The pontine nuclei (or griseum pontis) are the nuclei of the pons involved in motor activity. The pontine nuclei are located in the ventral pons. Corticopontine fibres carry information from the primary motor cortex to the ipsilateral pontine nucleus in the ventral pons, and the pontocerebellar projection then carries that information to the contralateral cerebellum via the middle cerebellar peduncle. Extension of these nuclei in the medulla oblongata are named arcuate nucleus (medulla) which has the same function.

They therefore allow modification of actions in the light of their outcome, or error correction, and are hence important in learning motor skills.

References

External links
 
 Diagram at mindsci-clinic.com

Pons
Brainstem nuclei